The Port Washington Police District is a police district serving portions of the Town of North Hempstead in Nassau County, Long Island, New York, United States. The district includes Baxter Estates and Port Washington North, and nearly all of Port Washington. It is the only special police district in the state.

History 

The Port Washington Police District was established in November 1921, after an uptick in burglaries plagued the Greater Port Washington area, in addition to a large influx of new residents. The first day of operations was January 1, 1922.

In 1925, the creation of the Nassau County Police Department led to the New York State Attorney General Albert Ottinger voicing his opinion that all other special police districts in Nassau County be eliminated in favor of the NCPD. The issue, which involved concerns of being double-taxed over police protection, led to the budget being held up that year.

In 1933, the PWPD was officially recognized and legislated after the majority of North Hempstead voters voted on August 2, 1933 in favor of keeping the district. On May 28, 1934, Governor Herbert Lehman authorized the town board to appoint commissioners; the control over the district would then be given by the town board to the commissioners. It was on that day when the PWPD was declared a separate unit.

In 1979, the Nassau County District Attorney investigated the PWPD after the police chief revealed that the commissioner had been allowed to remain in his position despite failing the civil service exam three times.

In 1984, residents and officials in the Incorporated Village of Manorhaven debated whether or not the village should join the Port Washington Police District. If approved, the Port Washington Police District would take over police services within the village from the Nassau County Police Department. Those in favor of the plan felt that the Port Washington Police District would be able to better serve the needs of the village, while opponents had concerns over potential tax increases as a result of joining the district. Ultimately, Manorhaven decided to remain under the jurisdiction of the Nassau County Police Department, which, as of 2022, continues to provide the village with its police services. Manorhaven had previously debated the same issue of whether or not to replace the NCPD with the PWPD in 1948; the outcome in 1948 was the same as in 1984.

In the 1990s, the PWPD faced a series of lawsuits over gender and racial discrimination in hiring and promoting.

In 2021, the Port Washington Police District celebrated its centennial.

Board of Police Commissioners 
, the Port Washington Police District's Board of Commissioners consists of Angela Lawlor Mullins, Frank T. Scobbo, and Brian G. Staley Sr.

See also 

 List of law enforcement agencies in New York
 List of Long Island law enforcement agencies

References

External links 

 Official website

Town of North Hempstead, New York
Special districts in Nassau County, New York
Special districts of New York (state)
Law enforcement agencies of New York (state)